was a town located in Nakakoma District, Yamanashi Prefecture, Japan.

As of 2003, the town had an estimated population of 10,612 and a population density of 1,291.00 persons per km2. The total area was 8.22 km2.

On February 20, 2006, Tamaho, along with the town of Tatomi (also from Nakakoma District), and the village of Toyotomi (from Nishiyatsushiro District), was merged to create the city of Chūō.

External links
 Chūō official website 

Dissolved municipalities of Yamanashi Prefecture
Chūō, Yamanashi